la Escuela Secundaria Tecnica Quimica Industrial y Minera - ESTQIM (Technical, Chemical, Industrial and Mining High School), Argentine high-school located in Malargüe, Mendoza Province. The school currently has 800 students, and it is one of the most popular schools in the city, competing against the schools ISMA and Aborigen Americano.

The school offers a curriculum mainly based on chemistry, industrial, and other technical subjects. Students must choose an orientation after their 3rd year, for either chemistry (3 more years) or tourism (2 more years). Chemistry involves technical and engineering classes. while tourism is more like a normal baccalaureate with some inclinations towards tourism and advertising.

Schools in Argentina
Education in Mendoza Province
Technical schools